The Hill is the second studio album from gospel singer Travis Greene. RCA Inspiration, a division of RCA Records released the album on October 30, 2015.

Track listing

Charts

Singles

External links

2015 albums